The 1939 Victorian Football Association season was the 61st season of the Australian rules football competition. The premiership was won by the Williamstown Football Club, which came from fourth on the ladder to defeat Prahran by nine points in the Grand Final on 7 October. It was the club's third VFA premiership, and it was a strong revival after having won the wooden spoon in 1938.

Premiership 
The home-and-home season was played over twenty matches, a large increase from 1938 when sixteen matches were played, before the top four clubs contested a finals series under the Page–McIntyre system to determine the premiers for the season. This pushed the end of the season into October, the weekend after the Victorian Football League Grand Final. It became standard for the VFA Grand Final to be scheduled for the weekend after the VFL Grand Final until 1963.

Ladder

Finals

Awards 
 George Hawkins (Prahran) was the leading goalkicker for the season, kicking 150 goals in the home-and-home season and 164 goals overall. Hawkins broke Frank Seymour's Association record of 130 goals in a season; he also exceeded Western Australian forward George Doig's national record of 152 goals in a season, although it was not recognised as a national record because the Association was not playing under ANFC rules at the time.
 In the parallel Association best and fairest awards:
 Pat Hartnett (Brighton) won the Recorder Cup, polling five votes. Laurie Nash (Camberwell), Arthur Cutting (Williamstown), George Hawkins (Prahran) and Cec Ruddell (Northcote) finished equal second with four votes apiece.
 The Association Medal was won for the second straight year by Arthur Cutting (Williamstown), who polled 32½ votes. Laurie Nash (Camberwell) finished second with 30 votes, and Pat Hartnett (Brighton) finished third with 26 votes.
 Coburg won the seconds premiership. Coburg 11.22 (88) defeated Port Melbourne 7.7 (49) in the Grand Final, played as a curtain raiser to the seniors Grand Final on Saturday 7 October at the Melbourne Cricket Ground.

Notable events 
 On 2 September, Brunswick 37.16 (238) defeated Oakleigh 7.10 (52) by 186 points. The score set a new record for the highest score ever in an Association match, beating 's record of 30.31 (211) set in 1922.
 With the high scores from the throw pass, five separate players – Hawkins, Harry Vallence (Williamstown), Harold Jones (Brunswick), Lance Collins (Coburg) and Laurie Nash (Camberwell) – kicked more than 100 goals for the season.
 The fact that the Association had moved the end of the season into October resulted in a scheduling clash between the football finals and preparations for the district cricket season. The Association scheduled the preliminary final for Toorak Park, where most finals had been held for the previous four seasons; but, the Prahran Cricket Club, which held the lease, refused to allow the match to be played, as it wanted to topdress the ground so that it was ready for the start of the cricket season on 7 October; the club was concerned that it would be excluded from the Victorian Cricket Association if the ground was not ready. The Prahran City Council, which leased the ground to the cricket club, preferred to see the high-drawing football final played on the ground, and overruled the cricket club to ensure that the game was played at Toorak Park. Both sides believed that the terms of the lease put them in the legal right. In the week leading up to the final, the cricket club's curator began to harrow the field, and was removed – allegedly physically – by representatives of the council. The cricket club took the council to court to seek an injunction against the preliminary final being played at Toorak Park, but it was not granted and the match went ahead as scheduled.
 The Grand Final attracted an all-time Association record attendance of 47,098, despite drizzly weather. The attendance broke the record set in the 1908 Grand Final.
 On Saturday 14 October, Coburg played an exhibition match against a combined team from Tasmania's North Western Football Association – a competition which had adopted the Association's throw-pass rule – at Devonport Oval in front of a large crowd. Coburg 21.23 (149) defeated the NWFA 7.8 (50).

External links 
 List of VFA/VFL Premiers

References 

Victorian Football League seasons
VFL